El Brujo (Spanish for the "wizard", "warlock", "sorcerer" or "witch doctor") can refer to:

Nickname
 Amancio Amaro (born 1939), Spanish former footballer
 Manuel Fleitas Solich (1900–1984), Paraguayan football player and coach
 José López Rega (1916-1989), Argentina's Minister of Social Welfare
 Dámaso Rodríguez Martín (1945-1991), Spanish serial killer
 José Andrés Martínez (born 1994), Venezuelan soccer player
 Ramiro Mendoza (born 1972), former Major League Baseball pitcher
 Juan Quarterone (born 1935), Argentine footballer
 Cuco Valoy (born 1937), Dominican singer

Other uses
 El Brujo, an archaeological site in Trujillo, La Libertad Province, Peru
 El brujo, a 1977 Spanish comic book

See also
 Brujo (disambiguation)
 The Wizard (nickname)

Lists of people by nickname